Augustus James Pleasonton, often called A. J. Pleasonton (January 21, 1808 – July 26, 1894), was a militia general during the American Civil War. He wrote the book The Influence of the Blue Ray of the Sunlight and of the Blue Color of the Sky, which was published in 1876. His book is often attributed to being the birth of the contemporary pseudoscientific practice of chromotherapy. He was the son of Stephen Pleasonton and elder brother of Civil War General Alfred Pleasonton.

Biography

Personal life
Augustus Pleasonton was born in Washington D.C. in 1808. He was the second son of Stephen Pleasonton (originally from Delaware) and Mary Hopkins (from Lancaster, Pennsylvania). Stephen Pleasonton served in the US State Department from 1800 until his death in 1854. Stephen Pleasonton served as the fifth auditor of the Treasury Department, acting Commissioner of the Revenue of the United States, and Chief of the Light House Department. Stephen Pleasonton fought in the War of 1812, earning him fame and honor as a commander for the United States. Stephen Pleasonton's wife (Augustus Pleasonton's mother), was the third daughter of John Hopkins, a wealthy farmer and then-Senator of the state of Pennsylvania. Stephen Pleasonton is of Norman-descent and his wife, Mary Hopkins, is of English descent.

Augustus Pleasonton would go on to serve in the military, directly influenced by his father's public and civil service, as would Augustus's younger brother, Alfred Pleasonton who commanded the Cavalry Corps in the Civil War.

Pleasonton married Caroline Dugan. Six of their children survived infancy: Anna Josephine, Antoinette, Augustus, Alfred, Francis S., and Edward Rodney. Caroline died on November 25, 1855. In 1864, Pleasonton married Elizabeth Hoge.

Military service
Pleasonton attended the United States Military Academy, and graduated in 1826. His first posting was at the Artillery School of Practice at Fort Monroe, Virginia. From 1827 he served on topographical duty, resigning in June 1830.

In 1833, he became a brigade major in the Pennsylvania volunteer militia. In 1835 he was elected as colonel of the Regiment of Artillery, First Brigade, and served as assistant adjutant general and paymaster general of the state of Pennsylvania. He became president of the Harrisburg, Portsmouth, Mountjoy and Lancaster Railroad in 1839. In July 1844, while engaging armed rioters in Southwark, Pennsylvania, he was wounded by a musket ball to the left groin. He continued serving in the militia until 1845.

Civil War
During the Civil War, Augustus was appointed to the rank of brigadier general of the Pennsylvania militia in May 1861. He commanded a 10,000-strong detachment of home guard infantry, cavalry, and artillery for the defense of the city of Philadelphia.

His younger brother Alfred served as a general for the Federal Union Army in the American Civil War.

The Influence of the Blue Ray of the Sunlight
In his later years, Gen. Pleasonton came to a theory that the blue wavelengths from the sun are inherently unique and that the blue rays from the sun are especially influential in the growth of plant and animal life. He also postulated that blue light was especially significant in the health of humans and helped eradicate disease. This theory is pseudoscientific and was never adopted by mainstream scientists, even in his time, but it is often credited as being the birth of modern chromotherapy. Chromotherapy, also called color therapy, is an alternative medicine therapy method which states that certain colors can influence the health of a person.

His basis for his theory was that plants flourished in the spring time and not in the winter, when the sky was less blue. Between the years 1861 and 1876, he tested this theory by establishing greenhouses to grow grapes and ran experiments on plants and animals. His grape experiment consisted of growing grapes in a greenhouse-like building (which was illustrated in the back of his book) where he alternated direct sunlight with filtered blue light. He claimed that this method greatly increased his production of grapes.

He published his theory and experiments in his book, entitled The Influence Of The Blue Ray Of The Sunlight And Of The Blue Colour Of The Sky and the subtitle: In developing animal and vegetable life; in arresting disease, and in restoring health in acute and chronic disorders to human and domestic animals.  It is an expansion, including experiments done between 1873 and 1876, of an earlier 24 page monograph On the Influence of the Blue Color of the Sky in developing Animal and Vegetable Life (1871)

Influence

Blue-glass craze
Pleasonton's theory led to what was called the "Blue-glass Craze", whereby people began growing crops under blue light. Soon, blue panes of glass were being sold as a way to increase crop production. The term "blue-grass craze" was also used later.

Chromotherapy
After Pleasonton's findings, scientist Dr. S. Pancoast studied the blue-light phenomenon and described his findings in his book Blue and Red Light; or, Light and Its Rays as Medicine which was published in 1877. Edwin Dwight Babbitt was also influenced by this concept and published a book about chromotherapy in 1878, entitled The Principles of Light and Color.

Pop culture
Alternative-rock band OK Go's concept album, Of the Blue Colour of the Sky, is influenced by Pleasonton's book.

References

External links 
 Influence Of The Blue Ray Of The Sunlight And Of The Blue Colour Of The Sky by AJ Pleasonton
 Obituary

1801 births
1894 deaths
American militia generals